The Academic and Research Center, or ARC Building, of Ohio University, is a research center built in 2009 and first used in January 2010. The Academic and Research Center is located to the north-east of Stocker Engineering and Technology Center, in the West Green, between coordinates E-3 and F-3 on the official university map. It is marked as #184 on the map.

Funding
The $34.5 million ARC building is one of only four university buildings financed primarily through private donations. The Osteopathic Heritage Foundations contributed $10 million toward construction, and Board of Trustees member and Russ College alumnus Charles Stuckey and his wife, Marilyn, donated $5 million. In total, more than $22 million was raised from more than 550 individuals, corporations, alumni, and friends of OU-COM and the Russ College.

Architecture
The ARC building, in addition to Baker University Center and Adams Hall, is one of several new buildings to feature Federalist architecture, as demonstrated in brick and stone cement work.

The ARC building connects both Stocker Center and Irvine Hall, making it easy for collaborating researchers to work together. Already at the forefront of diabetes and cancer research and drug development, specialized research-designated floors, with “suite-style” laboratories encourage further breakthroughs and even more biotechnological work. Ten researchers from the Russ College and OU-COM tackle major health and technology issues in the 22 laboratory spaces, with one floor devoted to diabetes research and one floor devoted to cancer research. There are also additional laboratories set aside for the recruitment of further research talents to Ohio University.

The building has 13 classrooms. The Academic and Research Center now contains all of the Russ College's learning space. The architecture and interior design were developed with collaboration in mind. Almost all of the furniture in the ARC is mobile, easily creating group spaces, and smaller study nooks with comfortable chairs and tables distributed throughout the building.

Student activity
Students working on large-scale projects make use of a two-story,  project hangar in the ARC, which features a five-ton-capacity crane and floor hatch that can accommodate automobiles and move equipment inside or out.

References

Ohio University